The House of Marney is a 1927 British silent crime film directed by Cecil Hepworth and starring Alma Taylor, John Longden and James Carew. It was based on a novel by John Goodwin.

Cast
 Alma Taylor - Beatrice Maxon 
 John Longden - Richard 
 James Carew - Piers Marney 
 Patrick Susands - Stephen Marney 
 Gibb McLaughlin - Ezra 
 Cameron Carr - Madd Matt 
 Stephen Ewart - Gerald Maxon 
 John MacAndrews - Puggy

References

External links

1926 films
Films directed by Cecil Hepworth
1926 crime films
British crime films
Films based on British novels
British black-and-white films
British silent feature films
1920s English-language films
1920s British films